Kalabam  is a village in the Avadaiyarkoilrevenue block of Pudukkottai district, Tamil Nadu, India.

Demographics 

As per the 2001 census, Kalabam had a total population of 1664 with 791 males and 873 females. Out of the total population 1121 people were literate.

References

Villages in Pudukkottai district